Steeler is the debut studio album by the American heavy metal band of the same name, released in 1983. It was largely recorded at Prairie Sun Studios in Cotati, California, about fifty miles north of San Francisco. It was the only album released by the band until a 2005 compilation album released by singer Ron Keel. After the album was released the band broke up. Guitarist Yngwie Malmsteen joined the band Alcatrazz, bassist Rik Fox would form Sin, drummer Mark Edwards signed on with Lion, while Ron Keel would spin off Steeler into Keel.

Track listing
All credits adapted from the original recording.
Side one
"Cold Day in Hell" (Ron Keel) - 4:17
"Backseat Driver" (Keel, Mark Edwards) - 3:24
"No Way Out" (Keel, Edwards, Yngwie Malmsteen) - 5:18
"Hot on Your Heels" (Keel) - 6:35

Side two
"Abduction" (Keel, Malmsteen, Rik Fox) - 1:10
"On the Rox" (Keel, Edwards) - 2:54
"Down to the Wire" (Keel, Edwards) - 3:52
"Born to Rock" (Keel, Edwards) - 3:06
"Serenade" (Keel) - 6:15

"Hot on Your Heels", contains a three-and-a-half-minute-introduction played by Yngwie Malmsteen
"Abduction", is an instrumental serving as an introduction to "On the Rox".

Personnel
Band members
 Ron Keel - vocals, rhythm guitar
 Yngwie Malmsteen - lead guitar
 Rik Fox - bass
 Mark Edwards - drums

Additional musicians
Peter Marrino - additional backing vocals on tracks 3 and 8

Production
Steeler - arrangements
Mike Varney - producer
Allen Sudduth - engineer, mixing 
Allen Isaacs, Mooka Rennick - assistant engineers
Paul Stubblebine - mastering at The Automatt, San Francisco, California
All Songs Published By Varney Metal Music Co. (BMI)

References

1983 debut albums
Steeler (American band) albums
Shrapnel Records albums
Albums produced by Mike Varney